The existence of frozen soft-tissue remains and DNA of woolly mammoths has led to the idea that the species could be recreated by scientific means. In 2003 the pyrenean ibex was briefly revived, giving credence to the idea that the mammoth could be successfully revived. As of today, several methods have been proposed to achieve this goal, including cloning, artificial insemination, and genome editing. The ethics of reviving the animal have given rise to disagreements.

Overview

A proposed scientific use of preserved genetic material found in remains of woolly mammoths is to recreate living mammoths. This has long been discussed theoretically, but was only recently the subject of formal effort due to advances in molecular biology techniques and cloning of mammals. Cloning of mammals has improved in the last two decades. As of date, no viable mammoth tissue or its intact genome has been found to attempt cloning. 

According to one research team, a mammoth cannot be recreated, but the team will try to eventually grow in an "artificial womb" a hybrid elephant with some woolly mammoth traits.<ref>De-extinction and Conservation. Gregory E. Kaebnick, and Bruce Jennings. The Hastings Center Report. 26 July 2017</ref> Comparative genomics shows that the mammoth genome matches 99% of the elephant genome, so researchers working in the field aim to engineer an elephant with mammoth genes, that code for the external appearance and traits of a mammoth. The outcome would be an elephant-mammoth hybrid with no more than 1% mammoth genes. Separate projects are working on gradually adding mammoth genes to elephant cells in vitro.

Colossal Biosciences, founded in 2021, is one biotechnology company that has publicly stated that its project is to genetically resurrect the woolly mammoth, combining its genes with Asian elephant DNA. It has publicly stated that it intends to complete the project by 2027.

Cloning
Cloning involves removal of the DNA—containing nucleus of the egg cell of a female elephant, and replacement with a nucleus from woolly mammoth tissue, a process called somatic cell nuclear transfer. For example, Akira Iritani, at the Kyoto University in Japan, reportedly planned to do this. The cell would then be stimulated into dividing, and implanted in a female elephant. The resulting calf would have the genes of the woolly mammoth. However, nobody as of date has found a viable mammoth cell to begin the cloning process, and most scientists doubt that any living cell could have survived freezing in the tundra of the Arctic.Bringing them Back to Life
. Carl Zimmer, National Geographic. April 2013.Shapiro, 2015. p. 11 Because of their conditions of preservation, the DNA of frozen mammoths has deteriorated significantly over the millennia.Lister, 2007. pp. 42–43

Artificial insemination

A second method involves artificially inseminating an elephant egg cell with sperm cells from a frozen woolly mammoth carcass. The resulting offspring would be an elephant–mammoth hybrid, and the process would have to be repeated, so more hybrids could be used in breeding. After several generations of cross-breeding these hybrids, an almost pure woolly mammoth would be produced. Whether the hybrid embryo would be carried through the two-year gestation is unknown; in one case, an Asian elephant and an African elephant produced a live calf named Motty, but it died of defects at less than two weeks old.
There is also another fact to consider, that sperm cells of modern mammals are viable for 15 years at most after deep-freezing. This makes this method unfeasible. 

Gene editing

In April 2015, Swedish scientists published the complete genome (nuclear DNA sequence) of the woolly mammoth. Several projects are working on gradually replacing the genes in elephant cells with mammoth genes. One such project is that of Harvard University geneticist George M. Church, who is funded by the Long Now Foundation, is attempting to create a mammoth–elephant hybrid using DNA from frozen mammoth carcasses. According to the researchers, a mammoth cannot be recreated, but they will try to eventually grow a hybrid elephant with some woolly mammoth traits in an "artificial womb". 
In 2017, George Church said "Actually it would be more like an elephant with a number of mammoth traits. We're not there yet, but it could happen in a couple of years." The creature, sometimes referred as a "mammophant", would be partly elephant, but with features such as small ears, subcutaneous fat, long shaggy hair and cold-adapted blood. The Harvard University team is attempting to study the animals' characteristics in vitro by replacing or editing some specific mammoth genes into Asian elephant skin cells called fibroblasts that have the potential to become embryonic stem cells. By March 2015 and using the new CRISPR DNA editing technique, Church's team had some woolly mammoth genes edited into the genome of an Asian elephant; focusing on cold-resistance initially, the target genes are for the external ear size, subcutaneous fat, hemoglobin, and hair attributes. By February 2017, Church's team had made 45 substitutions to the elephant genome. So far his work focuses solely on single cells. In 2021, Church received $15 million in funding and spun off a new company called Colossal.

The Mammoth Genome Project at Pennsylvania State University is also researching the modification of African elephant DNA to create a mammoth–elephant hybrid. If a viable hybrid embryo is obtained by gene editing procedures, implanting it into a female Asian elephant housed in a zoo may be possible, but with the current knowledge and technology, whether the hybrid embryo would be carried through the two-year gestation is unknown.

Ethics

If any method is ever successful, a suggestion has been made to introduce the hybrids to a wildlife reserve in Siberia called the Pleistocene Park, but some biologists question the ethics of such recreation attempts. In addition to the technical problems, not much habitat is left that would be suitable for mammoth–elephant hybrids. Because both species are [were] social and gregarious, creating a few specimens would not be ideal. The time and resources required would be enormous, and the scientific benefits would be unclear, suggesting these resources should instead be used to preserve extant elephant species which are endangered. The ethics of using elephants as surrogate mothers in hybridisation attempts has also been questioned, as most embryos would not survive, and knowing the exact needs of a hybrid mammoth–elephant calf would be impossible.

 Woolly mammoths and sustainability 
Researchers from the company Colossal confirmed that their primary goal when trying to revive the woolly mammoth is to better the environment and climate change itself. However, some people are skeptical of climate change being reversed due to the comeback of the woolly mammoth or an animal that is scientifically reproduced like a woolly mammoth. Hence, Colossal is planning on putting such animals produced from the modification of genomes back into the Siberian Tundra to help decrease the rise in the area's temperature. It has been proven that throughout the years, the Siberian Tundra has been warming up, and as a result, it has started releasing carbon dioxide into the air. Researchers believe that the Siberian Tundra will entirely vanish within the upcoming years since, over the past fifty years, the tundra has seen a two-celsius degree increase within their average air temperature. All of this is said to be the result of climate change, in which temperatures at places like the Siberian Tundra are increasing at an alarming rate. At the same time, within the Siberian Tundra, the moss population has grown throughout the years due to the absence of the woolly mammoth within such an environment. With this in mind, scientists consider the woolly mammoths as "ecosystem engineers" in which they balance out the environment by preserving the grasslands within certain areas, like the Siberian Tundra, by breaking up the moss while they walk through the site. They also knocked down trees and, at the same time, provided fertilizer to their surrounding areas with their droppings. Hence, it is said that with the woolly mammoths back in the tundras, the soil within that area would be stopped from eroding and melting, which with this, the woolly mammoths can also help lock away the heat-trapping carbon dioxide that is released to the air.

See also
List of animals that have been cloned
De-extinctionHow to Clone a Mammoth: The Science of De-Extinction'' – a book by Beth Shapiro
George Church
Colossal Biosciences

References

Mammoths
Cloning
Cloned animals
Animal welfare